El Maan is a town in the south-central Banaadir region of Somalia. It is situated around 20 miles north of the capital Mogadishu. A coastal settlement, it has a minor seaport.

References

Populated places in Banaadir